Bob's is the first Brazilian fast food chain, founded in 1952.

Bob's may also refer to:

Businesses
 Bob's Big Boy, an American restaurant chain
 Bob's-Cola, a defunct American soft drink company
 Bob's Discount Furniture, a privately owned chain in the eastern United States
 Bob's Red Mill, an Oregon-based grain company
 Bob's Stores, a defunct clothing retail chain of the United States
 Bob's Watches, an online marketplace for the resale of Rolex watches

Places
 Bob's Lake (disambiguation), three lakes in Ontario, Canada
 Bob's Creek (Ontario), Canada

Other
 Bob's Burgers, an American animated sitcom
 Bob's Return, a racehorse

See also
 Bob (disambiguation)